Jackrabbit was an early 20th century mining community in Pinal County, Arizona, USA, just north of the border of Pima County.

The Jackrabbit area is located at the northern end of the Slate Mountains and includes the
Jackrabbit, Turning Point, and the Desert Queen Mines. Mining activity peaked in 1910 when human settlement in the area was concentrated in the community of Jackrabbit. By 1960, there was no active mining in the area, few remains of any building or equipment, and no human habitation.

References

Populated places in Pinal County, Arizona